Nilkantha may refer to:

 Nilkantha (mountain)
 Nilkantha, Nepal

Family name 
 Mahipatram Rupram Nilkanth, Gujarati educationist, reformer, novelist and biographer.
 Ramanbhai Nilkanth, Gujarati writer
 Vidyagauri Nilkanth, Gujarati social reformer, educationist, and writer